Kristýna Horská (born 30 September 1997) is a Czech swimmer. She competed in the 2020 Summer Olympics.

References

1997 births
Living people
Sportspeople from Prague
Swimmers at the 2020 Summer Olympics
Czech female swimmers
Olympic swimmers of the Czech Republic